The fifth USS Dolphin (SP-874) was a United States Navy patrol vessel in commission during 1918.

Dolphin was built as the civilian motorboat Ora Belle in 1911 by H. C. Carson Love. Used as a pleasure craft in the Charleston, South Carolina, area, she later was renamed Dolphin.

The US Navy acquired Dolphin on 21 July 1918 for World War I service as a patrol vessel. She was commissioned as USS Dolphin (SP-874) on 24 August 1918.

Assigned to the 6th Naval District, Dolphin operated on section patrol based at Charleston, South Carolina, for the rest of World War I.

Dolphin was returned to her owner on 16 December 1918.

Notes

References

Patrol vessels of the United States Navy
World War I patrol vessels of the United States
1911 ships